The Scania-Vabis 314/324/325 was a series of trucks produced by Swedish automaker Scania-Vabis between 1925 and 1936.

History 
Until 1927 Scania-Vabis had produced their trucks at two sites: at Scania in Malmö and at Vabis in Södertälje. The trucks were built entirely to customer order. This procedure was really not cost effective and although Scania-Vabis trucks were very expensive the company went bankrupt in 1921. After reconstruction Scania-Vabis emphasized their efforts on a "standard truck" which was first produced in Södertälje in 1925. With this new truck the company started its standardization of components and minimizing the number of variants that has made Scania one of the world's most profitable truck manufacturer.

Scania-Vabis 314 
Scania-Vabis’ new truck, unlike the older models, sported modern facilities like an overhead valve engine, four-speed gear box bolted directly to the clutch and the engine, prop shaft drive, pneumatic tires and a covered cab.

The smallest model 314 had a payload capacity of 1.5 tonnes. The car had a four-cylinder 3.5-liter engine but soon added a larger 4.3-liter variant. The lightweight 314-model disappeared again in 1927.

Scania-Vabis 325 

1925 also saw the introduction of the larger 325 with a payload capacity of 2 to 3 tonnes. The car had a four-cylinder 4.3-liter engine and was produced until 1936.

Scania-Vabis 324 
From 1928 on Scania-Vabis offered their standard truck with a six-cylinder engine under the name 324. This model was produced until 1934, and some trucks were sold with four-cylinder engine.

Engines

References

External links 
 Scania Group - history
 Swedish brass cars - picture gallery

314
Vehicles introduced in 1925